The individual show jumping at the 2008 Summer Olympics took place between 15 and 21 August, at the Hong Kong Sports Institute. Like all other equestrian events, the jumping competition was mixed gender, with both male and female athletes competing in the same division. There were 77 competitors from 29 nations. The event was won by Eric Lamaze of Canada, the nation's first victory in individual jumping and first medal of any color in the event since 1976. Silver went to Rolf-Göran Bengtsson of Sweden, that nation's first medal in individual jumping since 1932. American Beezie Madden, who had led through the three qualifying rounds in 2004 before a bad first final round put her in 30th overall in Athens, took the bronze medal in Beijing.

Background

This was the 23rd appearance of the event, which had first been held at the 1900 Summer Olympics and has been held at every Summer Olympics at which equestrian sports have been featured (that is, excluding 1896, 1904, and 1908). It is the oldest event on the current programme, the only one that was held in 1900.

Four of the top 11 riders (including ties for 10th place) from the 2004 Games returned: gold medalist Rodrigo Pessoa of Brazil, bronze medalist Marco Kutscher of Germany, fourth-place finisher Rolf-Göran Bengtsson of Sweden, and tenth-place finisher Nick Skelton of Great Britain. 1992 Olympic gold medalist Ludger Beerbaum of Germany also returned yet again. Jos Lansink of Belgium, a perennial Olympian like Beerbaum, was the reigning World Champion.

Azerbaijan, Bermuda, the People's Republic of China, Hong Kong, Ukraine, and the United Arab Emirates each made their debut in the event. The United States competed for the 20th time, matching absent France for most of any nation.

Qualification

Each National Olympic Committee (NOC) could qualify up to 4 horse and rider pairs; there were a total of 79 quota places. Each of the 16 nations qualified for the team jumping could enter 4 pairs in the individual event. The qualified teams were:

 Hosts China and Hong Kong
 5 teams from the World Equestrian Games: the Netherlands, the United States, Germany, Ukraine, and Switzerland
 3 teams from the European Jumping Championship: Great Britain, Sweden, and Norway
 3 teams from the Pan American Games: Brazil, Canada, and Mexico
 1 team each from regional groups F and G at the World Games: Saudi Arabia and Australia
 1 team from the group G qualification event: New Zealand

There were also 15 individual qualification places, with NOCs not earning team spots able to earn up to 2 individual spots. All of these places were assigned by regional groups:
 Groups A and B had two spots, assigned through rankings
 Group C had three spots, assigned through rankings
 Group D had one spot and Group E had 4 spots, assigned through the Pan American Games
 Group F had three spots, two assigned through the World Games and one through a qualification event
 Group G had two spots, one assigned through the World Games and one through a qualification event

Competition format

The competition used the five-round format introduced in 1992, with three rounds in the qualifying round and two rounds in the final. The first three rounds made up the qualifying stage. The second and third of those rounds were also used for the team jumping event. Following the qualifying rounds, the top 35 pairs moved on to the final stage. That stage was held over two rounds; only the top 20 pairs competed in the second of the two final rounds. Overall scores and final rankings were based on the sum of scores from both rounds of the final stage.

Schedule

All times are China Standard Time (UTC+8)

Results

Qualifying round

Round 1

Round 2

Round 3

Final round

Round A

Round B

Bronze medal jump-off

Gold medal jump-off

References

External links 

 Competition format

Olympics
Equestrian at the 2008 Summer Olympics